The 1925 County Championship was the 32nd officially organised running of the County Championship. Yorkshire County Cricket Club won the championship title for the fourth successive year.

Final placings were still decided by calculating the percentage of points gained against possible points available. The minimum number of matches required to qualify for the championship was increased to twelve home and away in a non-test match season.

Table
 Five points were awarded for a win.
 Three points were awarded for "winning" the first innings of a drawn match.
 Two points were awarded for "tying" the first innings of a drawn match.
 One points were awarded for "losing" the first innings of a drawn match.
 Final placings were decided by calculating the percentage of possible points.

References

1925 in English cricket
County Championship seasons